The Henge of Keltria (HoK) was an international druid order, founded in 1988 as a religious and educational organization. It was a 501(c)(3) nonprofit corporation. It is commonly regarded as being one of the first explicitly Celtic-focused American Druid Orders. The order drew upon the Mythological Cycle of Irish mythology and some other early Celtic/British texts for inspiration.

History 
The Henge of Keltria began organizing in 1988 as a "breakaway" organization from Ár nDraíocht Féin (ADF) with initial groves in Minnesota, Massachusetts, and Texas.
The bylaws of the organization divide the Order into two major divisions. First is a secular organization consisting of a president, vice-president, secretary, treasurer, and three ad hoc trustees.  This Board of Trustees is responsible for all operational activities of the organization.  The second division is a religious order consisting of an Elected Archdruid and elected Elders who comprise the Council of Elders which provides the theological direction for the church and maintains religious standards throughout the Order.  
The Henge registered with the state of Minnesota as a non-profit corporation in 1995 and received its 501(c)(3) determination letter from the IRS in 2005.
By 1989, it began publication of a quarterly newsletter, "Henge Happenings," for its membership. Also in 1989, the HoK began publishing Keltria: Journal of Druidism and Celtic Magick as a publicly available journal. Keltria Journal is more article driven and less newsy than the newsletter.  Keltria Journal ceased publication in 1998 after 39 issues and took a 13 year hiatus. Publication of the Keltria Journal began again in 2012. As of 31 Oct 2017 The Henge corporation was officially dissolved and new membership is no longer being accepted.

Principal Beliefs 
The Keltrian Druid practice recognizes three levels of experience: Ring of the Birch, Ring of the Yew, and Ring of the Oak. It also promotes three areas of service: Bardic service, Seer's service, and the Druid's service.
The three foundations of Keltrian Druidism:
Belief is secondary in Keltrian Druidism. Actions and practice determine the path that an individual is on. The goal of Keltrian Druidism is to develop a spiritual relationship with the Ancestors, Nature Spirits, and Gods and Goddesses in a Celtic context.

References

Publications
The following is a list of publications that the Henge of Keltria has produced.  "Henge Happenings" is published quarterly and Keltria: Journal of Druidism and Celtic Magick is still published on an occasional basis.

•	"Henge Happenings:" The Official Newsletter of the Henge of Keltria

•	Keltria: Journal of Druidism and Celtic Magick

•	Serpent's Stone: A Journal of Druidic Wisdom

•	The Henge of Keltria Book of Ritual

•	The Henge of Keltria Grove Leaders Handbook

External links
•	The Henge of Keltria website  
•	The Henge of Keltria blog 
•	Book of Keltria— Book compiled by members of the organization

Charities based in Minnesota
Neo-druidism
Religious charities based in the United States
Modern pagan organizations based in the United States
Religious organizations established in 1988
Modern pagan organizations established in the 1980s